The Broomgate drill hall is a former military installation in Lanark, Scotland.

History
The property comprises two houses, one built in the 17th century and the other built in the 18th century which were combined to form a workhouse in the 19th century. During the first half of the 20th century the property served as the headquarters of the Lanarkshire Yeomanry. The property was subsequently converted back to residential use.

Notes

References

Drill halls in Scotland
Buildings and structures in South Lanarkshire